Barbara Foley (born March 29, 1948) is an American writer and the Distinguished Professor of English at Rutgers University-Newark. She focuses her research and teaching on U.S. literary radicalism, African American literature, and Marxist criticism. The author of six books and over seventy scholarly articles, review essays, and book chapters, she has published on literary theory, academic politics, US proletarian literature, the Harlem Renaissance, and the writers Ralph Ellison and Jean Toomer. Throughout her career, her work has emphasized the centrality of antiracism and Marxist class analysis to both literary study and social movements.

Life
Born in New York City, Foley attended Radcliffe College from 1965–69, graduating Phi Beta Kappa and magna cum laude; she earned her Ph.D. with Honors from the University of Chicago in 1976. During the late 1960s and early 1970s, in the antiwar, antiracist, and feminist movements, she began what became an extended involvement with left-wing politics.  She taught at the University of Wisconsin from 1976–80 and at Northwestern University from 1980-87.  She was denied tenure by the Provost at Northwestern University on the grounds of  “grave professional misconduct”—stemming from her participation in a 1985 campus demonstration against Adolfo Calero, a Nicaraguan contra leader- even though she had been approved for tenure by her department, the A&P Committee, and the Dean of the College of Arts and Sciences. In 1987, the Modern Language Association (MLA) passed a resolution appealing to NU's President Arnold Weber to overrule the Provost's decision and grant tenure to Foley.  Since 1987 Foley has been on the faculty at Rutgers University-Newark.

Foley has been the recipient of awards for both teaching and scholar-activism at Rutgers University-Newark, as well of fellowships from the National Endowment for the Humanities and the American Council of Learned Societies.  Foley was elected to the MLA Delegate Assembly four times, for a total of twelve years, as representative of Politics and the Profession; she served as the President of the MLA Radical Caucus from 2005 to 2017.  Since 2000 she has been on the Editorial Board and Manuscript Committee at the Marxist journal Science & Society, where she is currently Vice-President.  She has lectured on American literature and Marxist theory in France and Cuba, as well as during four trips to China, where several of her works have been translated into Chinese. Since 1990 she has served as Chair of the National Organization for Women-NJ Task Force on Combating Racism.

Work

Foley's first book, Telling the Truth: The Theory and Practice of Documentary Fiction (Cornell University Press, 1986), is a Marxist commentary on texts combining fact and fiction.  Taking issue with post-structuralist and reader-response theories of discourse, Foley argues that fiction contains propositional content; she offers a historical materialist overview of the novel's changing modes of conveying cognition of the world beyond the text. Telling the Truth was described in a review in Modern Philology as proposing "a powerful theory for dealing with the assertions made by fictional texts. . . This is one of those rare books that will change the very way we think about literature."

Radical Representations: Politics and Form in US Proletarian Fiction, 1929-1941 (Duke, 1993) reflects Foley’s interest in Depression-era literary radicalism.  Arguing against the Cold War paradigms that continue to shape scholarship on left-wing writing, Foley examines contemporaneous debates over art and propaganda, investigates the relationship between left politics and literary form, and proposes an anatomy of the modes of proletarian fiction. The reviewer for MELUS wrote that Foley "has written a superbly researched and argued book . . . that is a must read for anyone interested in gaining a better understanding of the difficult project of creating a radical culture sensitive to issues of race, class and gender in the effort to build an egalitarian society."

Foley's third book, Spectres of 1919: Class and Nation in the Making of the New Negro (Illinois, 2003), explores the radical origins of the Harlem Renaissance.  Alain Locke's formulation of the New Negro as culture hero in his influential 1925 The New Negro: An Interpretation, Foley argues, was premised upon banishing the figure of the New Negro as social revolutionary that prevailed in the late 1910s and early 1920s.  The reviewer for American Literature designated Spectres of 1919 "a carefully argued, nuanced presentation of the genesis of the Harlem Renaissance. Foley's breadth of knowledge in American radical history is impressive."<ref>{{cite journal|last1=Miller|first1=Jeffrey W.|title=review of Spectres of 1919'|journal=American Literature|volume=77|pages=190–191|doi=10.1215/00029831-77-1-190}}</ref> In the Journal of American Studies, the book was described as "lucid and useful. . . . A heavyweight intervention, it prompts significant rethinking of the ideological and representational strategies structuring the era."

In Wrestling with the Left: The Making of Ralph Ellison's Invisible Man (Duke, 2010), Foley shifts the focus of her scholarship onto a detailed engagement with a single text. Here, she undertakes a reconstruction of the process by which Ellison composed his novel between 1945 and 1952.  Her investigation of the thousands of pages of draft manuscript and notes yields the conclusion that the novel familiar to readers was the product of multiple reconceptualizations and revisions.  Now viewed as a Cold War classic, Invisible Man was begun, she proposes, as a proletarian novel somewhat sympathetic with the left.  The assessment appearing in African American Review asserted, "After Foley’s analysis of the material in Ellison's drafts, one in fact gains an even greater appreciation for the richness and complexity of what remains one of the great works of American literature." The reviewer of Wrestling with the Left for Cultural Logic, noting Foley's treatment of politics and form, concluded that "Foley challenges not only prevailing views of Ellison and Invisible Man, and not only dominant views of early-to-mid-20th century U.S. history involving the Communist left (literary and otherwise), but. . . dominant conceptions of 'literature' and 'literary greatness' as such."

Foley's 2014 book, Jean Toomer: Race, Repression, and Revolution (Illinois, 2014), displays her growing interest in biography as a necessary component of Marxist criticism.  Invoking hitherto unexplored portions of the Toomer archive and expanding upon Fredric Jameson’s formulation of the political unconscious, Foley offers a new approach to both Toomer the man and Cane the book.  Nathan Grant, Toomer scholar and editor of African American Review, has written, “Barbara Foley’s contribution to Toomer studies newly places him in the contexts of both early twentieth-century Left politics and ‘New Negro’ sensibility.  Any assessment of the Harlem Renaissance is made all the richer by Foley’s study, with which subsequent scholarship must contend." According to Charles Scruggs, co-author of Jean Toomer and the Terrors of American History (1998), "Barbara Foley has written a brilliant book on Toomer.  I would go so far to say it is also the best researched book on Toomer that exists."

In Marxist Literary Criticism Today, Foley focuses on matters of pedagogy. Although the ability of capitalism to meet the needs of the majority of the world's people is being increasingly called into question, and many people look to literature for insight into the relationship between consciousness and material reality, there have been no general introductions to Marxist literary criticism since the books published by Terry Eagleton (Marxism and Literary Criticism) and Raymond Williams (Marxism and Literature) in the late 1970s. Filling this gap with a study attuned to the concerns of the twenty-first century, Foley lays out the key principles of Marxist theory (historical materialism, political economy, and ideology critique) essential to the study of literature. After examining the ways in which Marxist criticism both overlaps with and differs from other analytical approaches, Foley outlines principal debates that continue to shape the field of Marxist criticism. The book culminates in an extended study of a wide range of literary works—from the poetry of Matthew Arnold to E. L. James's Fifty Shades of Grey to the proletarian verse of Langston Hughes—that illustrate Marxism's distinct contribution to an understanding of the connections between literature and society.

Foley's book-length studies have been accompanied over the years by a series of articles and anthology contributions that exhibit her concerns as both a scholar and an activist. Her attention to developments in China is reflected in critical analyses of politics and economics appearing in Science & Society and Cultural Logic. Articles appearing in such journals as Science & Society, Mediations, Biography (journal), Rethinking Marxism, Cultural Logic, Cultural Critique, Genre, American Quarterly, and Comparative Literature display her participation in debates over Post-structuralism, Deconstruction, Marxist theory, Intersectionality, and the connections between race and class.  Her engagement with politics and the profession is reflected in several interviews—appearing in Dialogues on Cultural Studies, Reconstruction, Workplace, minnesota review, and Mediations—as well as in symposia and review essays featured in World Bank Literature, Contemporary Literature, New England Quarterly, and College Literature. Throughout her career, her interest in situating a range of US writers in political and historical context has resulted in readings appearing in such journals as African American Review, Obsidian, Cultural Logic, American Literature, Modern Fiction Studies, PMLA, Genre, and College Literature''.

For a complete listing of Foley's writings as well as direct internet access to her articles and book chapters, see her webpage.

References

External links
 Occupy Rutgers Newark Teach-in with Dr. Barbara Foley
 Youtube recording of Barbara Foley at Occupy Boston, April 2012
 Laura Sullivan, "A Tribute to Barbara Foley," Workplace: A Journal for Academic Labor 6, 1-3 (2000)
 

1948 births
Living people
American anti–Vietnam War activists
COINTELPRO targets
Cultural academics
Historians of the United States
Literary critics of English
American Marxist historians
Rutgers University faculty
Radcliffe College alumni
University of Chicago alumni